Nõuni is a village in Otepää Parish, Valga County in southeastern Estonia. Nõuni has a population of 259 (as of 1 January 2011).

Nõuni Lake is located in the village. Since 1763 an elementary school is operating on the shore of the lake.

Gallery

References

Villages in Valga County